Mekran Medical College (MMC) is a public medical institute located in Turbat, Balochistan, Pakistan. It is one of several medical colleges affiliated to the University of Balochistan and was recently recognized by the Pakistan Medical and Dental Council. MMC is home to 500 students in the MBBS program, with clinical rotations occurring at District Headquarters Hospital, Turbat. Faculty members hold appointments at basic sciences and clinical departments. There are full-time faculty members consisting of lecturers, assistant professors, associate professors and professors at MMC.

History 
In 2010, both the federal government and provincial government decided that more medical colleges were needed in the province to improve medical education, research and healthcare in Balochistan. Dr. Malik Baloch, former Chief Minister of Balochistan, led the way to construction of 3 medical colleges outside of the Quetta region in Turbat, Khuzdar and Loralai.

Recognition 

MMC is fully recognized by the Pakistan Medical and Dental Council (PMDC).

Gallery

See also
 Bolan Medical College

References

External links
Mekran Medical College Turbat - Home
Makran Medical College MMC Turbat

Medical colleges in Balochistan, Pakistan